Sir Stuart Auchincloss Coats, 2nd Baronet (20 March 1868 – 15 July 1959) was a British politician and Member of Parliament for Wimbledon from 1916 to 1918 and then East Surrey from 1918 to 1922.

Early life
Stuart was born on 20 March 1868.  He was the son of Sarah Ann (née Auchincloss) Coats (1838–1887) and Sir James Coats, 1st Baronet (1834–1913). He succeeded his father to the baronetcy in 1913.

Career
He unsuccessfully contested the Morpeth constituency as a Liberal Unionist in the 1906 general election and was also an unsuccessful candidate for Deptford in the January and December general elections of 1910. He was elected Conservative Member of Parliament for Wimbledon at a by-election in April 1916 and then for East Surrey in December 1918, retaining his seat until October 1922.

He was also a Private Chamberlain of Sword and Cape to Popes Pius X, Benedict XV, Pius XI and Pius XII.

Personal life
Sir Stuart was married to Jane Muir Greenlees, the daughter of Thomas Greenlees Jr. of Paisley, Renfrewshire, at Castlehead, Paisley, in 1891. Together, they were the parents of:

 Sir James Stuart Coats, 3rd Baronet (1894–1966), who married Lady Amy Gordon-Lennox, eldest daughter of Charles Gordon-Lennox, 8th Duke of Richmond.
 Muir Dudley Coats (1897–1927), who married socialite Audrey Evelyn James, the illegitimate daughter of Edward Grey, 1st Viscount Grey of Fallodon and the illegitimate granddaughter of Edward VII.  After his death, Audrey remarried several times, including to American department store heir, Marshall Field III.
 Margaret Mary Josephine Coats (1901–1987), who married Edward Knollys, 2nd Viscount Knollys.

In 1920, his wife was painted by Philip Alexius de László. In 1936, he sold Ballathie House, his family's seat in Perthshire, Scotland, to Colonel Stephen Hardie, a founder of the British Oxygen Company.

Sir Stuart died on 15 July 1959.  He was succeeded by his son Sir James Stuart Coats, 3rd Baronet.

Descendants
Through his daughter Margaret, he was the grandfather of Hon. Ardyne Knollys (b. 1929), and David Knollys, 3rd Viscount Knollys (b. 1931). Through his eldest son, he was the grandfather of Sir Alastair Coats, 4th Baronet (1921–2015).

Honours

Knight Commander of the Order of Pope Pius IX (with star)
Knight Commander of the Order of St. Gregory the Great
Knight Commander of the Order of the Crown of Italy

References

Hankinson, C. F. J. (ed.), Debrett's Baronetage, Knightage and Companionage, 1954, Odhams Press, 1954

Specific

External links 
 

1868 births
1959 deaths
Conservative Party (UK) MPs for English constituencies
Liberal Unionist Party parliamentary candidates
Coats, Stuart Auchinloss, 2nd Baronet
UK MPs 1910–1918
UK MPs 1918–1922